École polytechnique universitaire de Grenoble-Alpes (Polytech Grenoble) a French engineering College created in 2002.

The school trains engineers in seven majors:

 Computing and Electronics of Embedded Systems
 Industrial electronics and computing, apprenticeship training
 Geotechnics and Civil Engineering
 Materials
 Risk prevention
 Computer science
 Information technologies for health

Located in Grenoble, the Polytech Grenoble is a public higher education institution. The school is a member of the Grenoble Institute of Technology.

References

External links
 Polytech Grenoble

Engineering universities and colleges in France
Polytech Grenoble
Grenoble
Educational institutions established in 2002
2002 establishments in France